Merrick is a masculine given name which may refer to:

 Merrick Bremner (born 1986), South African professional golfer
 M. E. Carn (1808–1862), 48th Lieutenant Governor of South Carolina
 Merrick Cockell (born 1957), British politician
 Merrick Fry (born 1950), Australian artist
 Merrick Garland (born 1952), American judge and United States Attorney General
 Merrick James-Lewis (born 1992), English footballer
 Merrick Thomson (born 1983), Canadian former professional lacrosse player
 Merrick Watts (born 1973), Australian comedian, radio host and television presenter, of the comedy duo Merrick and Rosso
 Merrick Wing (1833-1895), American politician

Masculine given names